Harry Hopkinson (8 June 1902 – 4 March 1979) professionally also known as Austin Layton and Harry Torrani, was a British music hall performer, a soprano and songwriter who has been credited as one of the world's greatest yodelers. He was billed as the "Yodeling Cowboy from Chesterfield".

Biography
He came from a family of miners in Manchester, England and started singing in the North Wingfield Church choir, and after a spell working in the local colliery, entered show business in a troupe of traveling entertainers. The yodelling part of Hopkinson's act was expanded, and it was here he adopted the more commercial and continental-sounding name Harry Torrani.

Hopkinson recorded his first yodeling song on 27 August 1931 for the Regal Zonophone label, "Honeymoon Yodel" coupled with "Happy and Free". His recording career continued until 1942, and he recorded 25 records and 51 tracks. Some of his songs were "Yodel All Day", "Yodelers Dream Girl", "Honeymoon Yodel", "The Australian Yodel" (the B-side was "The Highland Yodel"), "Mammy’s Yodel!"  and "Mississippi Yodel!".

Hopkinson was married to wife Joy and had a daughter Dawn, he retired from show business during the late 1940s. In his retirement he worked as a watch repairer, after entering a nursing home and having suffered a stroke he died on 4 March 1979 at the age of 75.

Sources
  Country Music Stars of Yesteryear: Harry Torrani

1902 births
1979 deaths
English male singers
Yodelers
20th-century English singers
People from North Wingfield
20th-century British male singers